Tarek Bendiaf (born 8 September 1991) is an Algerian footballer who plays for USM Blida as a midfielder.

References

External links

1991 births
Living people
Association football midfielders
Algerian footballers
USM Blida players
21st-century Algerian people